The Mistichelli Hills are a group of moderately low, rocky coastal hills,  southwest of the McKaskle Hills, on the eastern margin of the Amery Ice Shelf, Antarctica. They were delineated in 1952 by John H. Roscoe from air photos taken by U.S. Navy Operation Highjump (1946–47), and were named by Roscoe for G. Mistichelli, an air crewman on Operation Highjump photographic flights over the area.

References

Hills of Princess Elizabeth Land
Ingrid Christensen Coast